Pearl Dymond ( Sellars; 2 October 1925 – 14 January 2010) was a New Zealand international lawn bowler.

Bowls career
Dymond started bowling for the Stratford club in 1962 and won a silver medal at the 1977 World Outdoor Bowls Championship in Worthing in the triples event with Cis Winstanley and Hazel Harper. An additional bronze medal was won in the team event.

She also played in the triples team that won the silver medal in the triples event with Jennifer Simpson and Joyce Osborne at the 1982 Commonwealth Games.

At club level Dymond won 16 Taranaki titles and nine senior champion of champions singles in addition to the 1979 New Zealand National Bowls Championships singles.

Personal life
Pearl Dymond's sister was Joyce Osborne and her brother was jockey and lawn bowler Vic Sellars.

References

New Zealand female bowls players
1925 births
2010 deaths
Bowls players at the 1982 Commonwealth Games
Commonwealth Games medallists in lawn bowls
Commonwealth Games silver medallists for New Zealand
Sportspeople from Invercargill
Medallists at the 1982 Commonwealth Games